This is a list of books published as the "Famous Scots Series" by the Edinburgh publishers, Oliphant, Anderson and Ferrier, from 1896 to 1905. Forty-two of these books were published though least one volume in the series was planned but never published. These books are distinctive for their bright red covers and uniform presentation. They are generally of a quite high scholarly quality. The authors often had access to biographical material which is no longer available. Two versions of each volume were published. An upmarket version has gilded lettering and motifs on the front cover and has gilt tape as book marker. It is about a quarter of inch longer than the ordinary version which is gilded only on the edge.

Thirty-three of the authors were men and five were women. It appears that all the women were educated at home, presumably by tutors or governesses. Three of the women wrote biographies of Robert Louis Stevenson, namely, Margaret Moyes Black, Rosaline Masson and Eve Blantyre Simpson.

No more books in this series were published, as is evidenced by the following report in the New York Times in 1904:
"LONDON, Sept. 16. -- Andrew Carnegie has written a little book on James Watt, the great engineer. It will be the concluding volume of the Famous Scots Series, published by Messrs. Oliphant, Anderson Ferrier."

External links
Books from the Famous Scots Series in Project Gutenberg

References

Lists of books
History of Edinburgh
Scottish literature
Lists of mass media in Scotland